Nizar Zaćiragić (born 19 June 1968) is a Bosnian bobsledder. He competed in the four-man event at the 1994 Winter Olympics.

References

External links
 

1968 births
Living people
Bosnia and Herzegovina male bobsledders
Olympic bobsledders of Bosnia and Herzegovina
Bobsledders at the 1994 Winter Olympics
Sportspeople from Sarajevo